La Grulla is a city in Starr County, Texas, United States, founded by Juan Santiago Longoria (3rd great grandfather of actress Eva Longoria) in 1836. The population was 1,622 at the 2010 census.

Geography

La Grulla is located at  (26.269278, –98.647067).

The city gained area prior to the 2010 census giving it a total area of 0.9 square mile (2.0 km), all land.

Demographics

2020 census

As of the 2020 United States census, there were 1,222 people, 432 households, and 327 families residing in the city.

2000 census
At the 2000 census there were 1,211 people, 370 households, and 297 families living in the city. The population density was 2,074.2 people per square mile (806.2/km). There were 468 housing units at an average density of 801.6 per square mile (311.5/km).  The racial makeup of the city was 75.72% White, 0.17% African American, 0.58% Native American, 22.71% from other races, and 0.83% from two or more races. Hispanic or Latino of any race were 97.61%.

Of the 370 households 40.5% had children under the age of 18 living with them, 54.6% were married couples living together, 19.2% had a female householder with no husband present, and 19.7% were non-families. 17.6% of households were one person and 10.8% were one person aged 65 or older. The average household size was 3.27 and the average family size was 3.70.

The age distribution was 33.9% under the age of 18, 10.7% from 18 to 24, 23.4% from 25 to 44, 18.8% from 45 to 64, and 13.2% 65 or older. The median age was 30 years. For every 100 females, there were 92.8 males. For every 100 females age 18 and over, there were 87.1 males.

The median household income was $16,648 and the median family income  was $18,359. Males had a median income of $15,789 versus $15,250 for females. The per capita income for the city was $6,700. About 34.6% of families and 40.0% of the population were below the poverty line, including 49.2% of those under age 18 and 43.6% of those age 65 or over.

Education
La Grulla is served by the Rio Grande City Grulla Independent School District (formerly Rio Grande City CISD).

References

Cities in Texas
Cities in Starr County, Texas
Populated places established in 1836
1836 establishments in the Republic of Texas